Mirny is a rural locality (a selo) and the administrative centre of Mirnovsky Selsoviet, Blagovarsky District, Bashkortostan, Russia. The population was 1,067 as of 2010. There are 18 streets.

Geography 
Mirny is located 17 km west of Yazykovo (the district's administrative centre) by road. Toporinka is the nearest rural locality.

References 

Rural localities in Blagovarsky District